Maleamate amidohydrolase (NicF) is an enzyme with systematic name maleamate amidohydrolase. This enzyme catalyses the following chemical reaction

 maleamate + H2O  maleate + NH3

The reaction is involved in the aerobic catabolism of nicotinic acid.

References

External links 
 

EC 3.5.1